The first season of Next Great Baker was televised from December 6, 2010 to January 24, 2011 on TLC. During this season, the last contestant standing would win $50,000 cash, a Chevrolet Cruze and an apprenticeship at Buddy's bakery, Carlo's Bake Shop in Hoboken, New Jersey.

Show opening
Each episode opens with the contestants engaged in a foodfight, with each contestant introduced. Near the end, Buddy enters the kitchen from his office, saying "This is gonna get ugly!", only to be clobbered in the face by a piece of cake.

Portions of the opening were also used in promos for the series; the early promos leading up to its premiere also included The Archies' Sugar, Sugar in the background.

Contestants
Ten chefs competed in the competition.

Contestant progress

 (WINNER) This baker won the competition.
 (RUNNER-UP) This baker was the runner-up of the competition.
 (THIRD) This baker placed third overall in the competition.
 (WIN) The baker(s) won the challenge.
 (HIGH) The baker(s) had one of the best cakes for that challenge, but did not win.
 (IN) The baker(s) advanced to the next week.
 (LOW) The baker(s) was/were a part of the team who lost, but was not the last to move on.
 (LOW) The baker(s) had the worst cake of those who advanced, and was/were the last to move on.
 (OUT) The baker(s) was/were eliminated.
 (WD) The baker(s) voluntarily withdrew from the competition

Notes

Episode guide

References

2010 American television seasons
2011 American television seasons
Next Great Baker